White Sulphur Springs station is a railway station in White Sulphur Springs, West Virginia, served by Amtrak, the national passenger railway.  The station is a stop on Amtrak's Cardinal route.

History
The station was built in 1930 or 1931 by the Chesapeake and Ohio Railway (C&O) to serve passengers on the new Pullman rail coaches to The Greenbrier resort hotel. The current brick building replaced a wooden structure that was built in the early 1900s. It is directly across from the entrance to The Greenbrier grounds.

The original cottages that eventually expanded to a resort property known as the Old White Hotel, was purchased by C&O in 1910. The hotel was renovated and reopened in 1913 as the Greenbrier. The hotel became a showcase for the railroad company and it was promoted in C&O's timetables and literature. Tracks behind the station were used for parking business-owned and private cars of the wealthy patrons that came to the hotel. The hotel stayed in the hands of C&O and its successors, Chessie System and CSX, until 2009.

The former station building now serves as the hotel's own Christmas gift shop. The station's red-and-white "candy cane" paint job makes it unique among other Amtrak stations. Since the late 1980s/early 1990s, Amtrak passengers have used the adjacent covered platform. No Amtrak agent or station services (ticketing, checked baggage, etc.) are available at this station, not even a Quik-Trak kiosk; all tickets must be purchased in advance.

See also
 Greenbrier Presidential Express

References

External links

White Sulphur Springs Amtrak Station (USA Rail Guide - Train Web)

Amtrak stations in West Virginia
Buildings and structures in Greenbrier County, West Virginia
Railway stations in West Virginia
Stations along Chesapeake and Ohio Railway lines
Transportation in Greenbrier County, West Virginia
White Sulphur Springs, West Virginia